A Werewolf Boy is a 2012 South Korean fantasy romance film in which a beautiful teenage girl (Park Bo-young) is sent to a country house for her health, where she befriends and attempts to civilize a feral boy (Song Joong-ki) she discovers on the grounds—but the beast inside him is constantly waiting to burst out.

Director Jo Sung-hee first wrote the script while studying at the Korean Academy of Film Arts and the script went through several rewrites before it was finalized in its current form. This is Jo's commercial debut; he previously directed the arthouse flick End of Animal and the short film Don't Step Out of the House.

A Werewolf Boy had its world premiere in the "Contemporary World Cinema" section of the 2012 Toronto International Film Festival, then screened at the 17th Busan International Film Festival before its theatrical release on October 31, 2012. It quickly rose up the box office charts to become the most successful Korean melodrama of all time.

Plot
Kim Sun-yi, an elderly woman in her sixties living in the US, receives a phone call about the sale of her old family home back in South Korea.

Returning to her homeland, she's met by granddaughter Eun-joo, and they drive back to the house in the country. Sun-yi recalls how 47 years ago, when she was a 17-year-old girl in 1965, she moved from Seoul along with her widowed mother and sister Sun-ja to a remote valley to undergo a period of convalescence after suffering problems with her lungs.

The Kims lived in genteel poverty at the mercy of their arrogant landlord, Ji-tae, son of the business partner of Sun-yi's late father. Because of her delicate health, the beautiful yet introverted Sun-yi lives an isolated life without any friends.

One day, Sun-yi discovers a feral boy of about 19 in their yard. His blood type is unidentifiable, and he can neither read nor speak. Even though he behaves like a wild beast, Sun-yi's kindhearted mother adopts him and names him Chul-soo, assuming he's one of more than 60,000 children orphaned in the Korean War.

At first, Sun-yi considers him a nuisance, but eventually has fun taming him according to a dog-training manual. She teaches him how to wait patiently before a meal, how to wear clothes, speak, write, and other human behavior so that he could one day live like a normal man. Chul-soo demonstrates unswerving loyalty and superhuman brawn, inspiring the envy of Ji-tae, who lusts after Sun-yi.

The two eventually become close; as Sun-yi opens her heart to Chul-soo, he in turn falls in love with her, the only person to ever show him affection. But their relationship is fraught with difficulties as Ji-tae begins to cause trouble. Feeling threatened, Chul-soo lets loose his bestial instincts and in their fear, the town villagers turn on him. In order to save the boy who risked his life to be with her, Sun-yi leaves him with a promise: "Wait for me. I'll come back for you."

In present day, Sun-yi walks into the shed to find Chul-soo sitting there, still as young as he was 47 years ago. He hands her the note that she wrote. She realizes that he's been waiting all along. He reads her a book she had asked him to read all those years ago, as she falls asleep. The next day, she wakes up with Chul-soo nowhere in sight, and leaves with her granddaughter. They receive a call from the county asking about the property. Sun-yi tells him that she's not selling the place. Chul-soo stares from afar as the car drives away.

A sequence in the ending credits shows Chul-soo building a snowman.

Cast

 Song Joong-ki as Chul-soo
 Park Bo-young as young Kim Sun-yi / Kim Eun-joo
 Lee Young-lan as old Kim Sun-yi
 Jang Young-nam as Sun-yi's mother
 Yoo Yeon-seok as Ji-tae
 Kim Hyang-gi as Kim Sun-ja
 Yoo Sung-mok as Professor Kang Tae-shik
 Seo Dong-soo as army colonel
 Woo Jeong-guk as Mr. Jung
 Gu Bon-im as Mrs. Jung
 Nam Jung-hee as Dong-seok's grandmother
 Ahn Do-gyu as Dong-seok
 Shin Bi as Dong-mi
 Lee Jun-hyeok as policeman
 Oh Yeong-seok as policeman
 Lee Sung-ju as Sun-yi's son
 Jang Seo-yi as Sun-yi's daughter-in-law
 Jo Jae-yun as Sun-yi's grandson

Music
The film's music video featured John Park's single "철부지" ("Childlike").

"My Prince," the song that Sun-yi sings in the film, was released as a digital single and included in the soundtrack. It was composed by music director Shim Hyun-jung with lyrics by director Jo Sung-hee.

Soundtrack

 나의 왕자님 ("My prince") – Park Bo-young
 Time she's forgotten
 47 years ago
 A boy in the house
 Decision to train him
 Sun-yi's family
 Chul-soo in the bath
 First love
 Training
 Let's go to play
 Cosplay
 Where there's love
 Special power
 Turning to wolf
 Discover the secret
 She collapses
 Ji-tae's anger
 Chul-soo in chains
 Evil plan
 Searching for guitar
 Out of control
 To the forest
 Love unreached
 Don't leave me
 Walking away
 For a long time
 A werewolf boy

Reception
After premiering at number one in the South Korean box office with more than 100,000 admissions, A Werewolf Boy broke the 1 million mark after five days, 2 million after nine days, and 3.6 million in twelve days. Not only were these numbers remarkably high for November, considered a slow season for moviegoing in Korea, but it was also a rare feat for its melodrama genre.

The film also has the distinction of setting a new box office record for "suneung day," the date on which high school seniors take their College Scholastic Ability Test. Each year large numbers of students book tickets for films in the evening after the exam has finished, but A Werewolf Boy'''s one-day score of 341,475 tickets on November 8 outpaced the totals of any film in previous years.

On November 15, its 4.12 million admissions surpassed Architecture 101 to become the most successful Korean melodrama of all time. Ticket sales reached 5 million on November 18, 6 million on November 26, then 7 million on December 16, making it the third highest Korean top grosser of 2012, behind The Thieves and Masquerade'', and also the fourth best selling film of the year overall.

The film also became a sleeper hit when it was released in Taiwan on December 28, 2012, grossing NT$4 million (US$138,000) at the Taipei box office after 17 days on release.

The film also made its premiere in the Philippines on September 18, 2013 as part of the Korean Movie Festival 2013.

Alternate ending
After director Jo Sung-hee revealed during one of the film's Q&A sessions that they had shot an alternate ending, due to popular demand, the movie was re-released on December 6, 2012 with that ending. The alternate finale involves Park Bo-young's Sun-yi, and among the deleted scenes are moments from Ji-tae's (Yoo Yeon-seok) childhood as well as more focus on the neighborhood in which the plot unfolds.

Book
A novelization was published on October 31, 2012, to coincide with the movie's opening day.

Awards and nominations

References

External links 
  
  
 
 
 
 22 Найкращі фільми про перевертнів!

2012 films
2010s romantic fantasy films
Films set in the 1960s
Films set in the 2010s
Films set in Gangwon Province, South Korea
Films shot in Jeju
2010s Korean-language films
CJ Entertainment films
South Korean romantic fantasy films
2010s South Korean films